The 1892 FA Cup final was contested by West Bromwich Albion and Aston Villa at the Kennington Oval. This was the last FA Cup Final to be played at Kennington Oval due to the Surrey Cricket authorities becoming increasingly alarmed at the large crowds now being attracted to the main game in the footballing calendar.

Albions form throughout the league season had been erratic and Villa supporters felt that all they had to do was turn up and the cup was theirs for the taking.  West Bromwich Albion won 3–0, with goals by Alfred Geddes, Sammy Nicholls and Jack Reynolds.

Villa began brightly on a warm, sunny day which helped swell the attendance to almost 33,000, but Albion had an early surprise in store and after just 4 minutes took the lead. Villa fought back hard but they found the Albion keeper Joe Reader in tremendous form.  Albion then made it 2-0 on the 27 minute mark and 10 minutes into the 2nd half, Villa's last hopes disappeared when Albion went 3 up.

Albion defended resolutely to see out the game with a clean-sheet and return with the cup to their Stoney Lane home. This was the first FA Cup Final in which goal-nets were used.

Match details

See also
 Aston Villa F.C.–West Bromwich Albion F.C. rivalry

References

Line-ups
Match report at www.fa-cupfinals.co.uk

1892
FA
West Bromwich Albion F.C. matches
Aston Villa F.C. matches
March 1892 sports events
1892 sports events in London